FC Wegberg-Beeck is a German association football club from the town of Wegberg, North Rhine-Westphalia. The club's greatest success has been promotion to the tier four Regionalliga West three times since 2015.

The club has also taken part in the first round of the DFB-Pokal, the German Cup, on one occasion, courtesy to a Middle Rhine Cup win.

History
The club was formed as Sportvereins 1920 Beeck in February 1920, became SC Beeck after the Second World War and adopted its current name in July 1996.

SC Beeck began its rise from local amateur level in 1993 when it won promotion to the Landesliga Mittelrhein followed by promotion to the Verbandsliga Mittelrhein the year after. The club won promotion to the Oberliga Nordrhein after a runners-up finish in the Verbandsliga in 1996 and achieved good results in its first three seasons there, a third-place finish in 1999 as its best result. The following three seasons the team gradually declined and was eventually relegated in 2002. It had to drop to the tier six Landesliga Mittelrhein for a season in 2002–03 but quickly recovered.

Returning to the tier five Verbandsliga Mittelrhein from 2003 the club finished seventh in its first season but won the league the year after. It was promoted to the Oberliga Nordrhein once more but lasted for only one season before dropping back down in 2006. Four more Verbandsliga seasons followed in which FC Wegberg-Beeck finished third in the first but then slipped to mid-table finishes for the next two. It qualified for the 2008–09 DFB-Pokal after a Middle Rhine Cup win the season before, but lost 4–1 to Alemannia Aachen in the first round. In 2009–10 it took out its second Verbandsliga title and moved up to NRW-Liga, the Oberliga Nordrhein having been disbanded in favour of a statewide league.

Again the club lasted only one season before being relegated again and returning to the Verbandsliga in 2011. After the 2011–12 season the NRW-Liga was disbanded after only four seasons and the Verbandsliga Mittelrhein took its place in the Middle Rhine region, becoming the Mittelrheinliga. The club played in this league until 2015 when a league championship earned it promotion to the Regionalliga West but lasted for just one season at Regionalliga level before being relegated again. They were promoted again as champions in 2017, once more surviving in the fourth tier for just one season, before earning their third Mittelrheinliga title in five years at the end of the 2019-20 season.

Current squad

Honours
The club's honours:

League
 Mittelrheinliga
 Champions: 2015, 2017, 2020
 Runners-up: 2014
 Verbandsliga Mittelrhein
 Champions: 2005, 2010
 Runners-up: 1996, 2012
 Landesliga Mittelrhein 2
 Champions: 2003

Cup
 Middle Rhine Cup 
 Winners: 2008
 Runners-up: 2014

Recent seasons 
The recent season-by-season performance of the club:

 With the introduction of the Regionalligas in 1994 and the 3. Liga in 2008 as the new third tier, below the 2. Bundesliga, all leagues below dropped one tier.

References

External links 
Official team site 
FC Wegberg-Beeck at Weltfussball.de 

FC Wegberg-Beeck
Football clubs in Germany
Football clubs in North Rhine-Westphalia
Association football clubs established in 1920
1920 establishments in Germany